Chao-Jun "C.-J." Li is E. B. Eddy Professor of Chemistry and Canada Research Chair in Green Chemistry at McGill University, Montréal. He works on organic transformation applied to Green chemistry, including C-H activation, reactions in water and photochemistry.

Education 
C.-J. Li was born in 1963, and obtained his BSc from Zhengzhou University (1979–1983), and completed his MSc. in organic synthesis at the Chinese Academy of Sciences (1985–1988) with Prof. T.H. Chan. He then moved to McGill University (Montréal, Québec) to do his PhD (1989–1992) with Prof. T.H. Chan again (and discovered the indium-mediated allylation reaction in water), along with Prof. David Harpp (working on organosulfur/selenium/tellurium chemistry), and went on a NSERC-funded postdoc with Prof. Barry Trost at Stanford University in the United States (1992–1994) (and discovered the so-called phosphine-catalyzed γ-addition reaction).

Career and research 
C.-J. Li started as an assistant professor at Tulane University in 1994, and attained the title of Professor of Chemistry in 2000. He then moved in 2003 to McGill University, where he obtained a Canada Research Chair (Tier I) in Green Chemistry. He has also been the director of NSERC CREATE for Green Chemistry (2012–2018), the director of CFI Infrastructure for Green Chemistry and Green Chemicals (2008–2018)  and has been the co-director of the FQRNT Center for Green Chemistry and Catalysis since 2009.

C.-J. Li's research encompasses various aspects of green chemistry applied to organic chemistry: organometallics, catalysis (thermal and light-based). Most notably, he is known for using water as a reaction media for various chemical reactions (hydrogenation, Grignard type-reactions in water). Li originated the concepts of Aldehyde-Alkyne-Amine Coupling (A3 coupling reaction) and the cross dehydrogenative coupling (CDC Reaction, or C-H/C-H coupling, or oxidative C-H cross coupling). His work on GaN nanowires as photocatalysts for the conversion of methane into benzene was covered by Phys.org in 2015, leaving prospects for hydrogen storage. Subsequently, his team showed that they were also able to convert methanol into ethanol. He also made breakthroughs in using hydrazones as organometallic surrogates in nucleophilic addition and cross-coupling, the direct amination of phenol derivatives. and the fluorescence enhancement due to self-assembling in solution.

Selected publications 
Reactions in water:

 The Barbier–Grignard-type arylation of aldehydes using unactivated aryl iodides in water
 Silver‐Catalyzed Hydrogenation of Aldehydes in Water

A3 coupling reaction

Cross dehydrogenative coupling

GaN photocatalysts

 Photoinduced Conversion of Methane into Benzene over GaN Nanowires
 Direct Catalytic Methanol-to-Ethanol Photoconversion via Methyl Carbene

Hydrazones as organometallic reagents surrogates:

 Carbonyls as alkyl carbanion equivalents for 1,2-nucleophilic additions, conjugate additions, and cross-couplings

References 

Stanford University alumni
Canadian people of Chinese descent
Academic staff of McGill University
Organic chemists
Zhengzhou University alumni
1963 births
Living people